This is an incomplete list of islands of Mexico.

Oceanic Islands (In the Pacific Ocean)

Islands on the continental shelf

Pacific Coast

Gulf of California

Gulf of Mexico / Caribbean

Inner Islands

Lake Chapala
 Isla de los Alacranes

Lake Pátzcuaro
 Janitzio,

Lake Texcoco
 Xaltocan

References

External links

IslandsI
Mexico
Geology of Mexico